Kate Barry (8 April 1967 – 11 December 2013) was a British fashion photographer, who worked for Vogue and The Sunday Times Magazine.

Life

Barry was the daughter of Franco-British actress and singer Jane Birkin and the composer John Barry, whose birth surname was Prendergast. Her maternal grandmother was the actress Judy Campbell and her uncle was the director Andrew Birkin. She moved from Britain to France as a child, and was raised by her mother and her mother's partner Serge Gainsbourg. She was estranged from her birth father until after her mother and Gainsbourg split up in 1980.

Barry had two half-sisters on her mother's side, French actress and singer Charlotte Gainsbourg and actress and singer Lou Doillon. She had two half-sisters on her father's side, Suzy and Sian and a half-brother, Jon-Patrick. In 1987, she gave birth to her only child, a son named Roman de Kermadec, with her partner, Pascal Huon de Kermadec.

Career
Barry was known for her intimate photographs of famous people. She worked frequently with her mother and sisters, and was also responsible for the album cover of Carla Bruni’s debut album Quelqu'un m'a dit.

In 2012, Barry released a book Dinard : Essai d'autobiographie immobilière in collaboration with journalist Jean Rolin.

Death
Barry suffered from an addiction to drugs and alcohol over many years, a problem which began when she was a teenager. In the early 1990s she founded the charity Aide et Prévention des Toxicodépendances par l’Entraide (APTE) to aid drug addicts to recover via therapy, which successfully kept her clean for years.

On 11 December 2013, Barry died as a result of a fall from her fourth floor apartment in the 16th arrondissement of Paris, in what was assumed to be a suicide. Her sister Charlotte Gainsbourg later disputed the reports of suicide, saying "I want to believe it's an accident" but admitting that it was impossible to know whether Barry's death was accidental or a deliberate act. Barry was buried in Paris.

References

External links

1967 births
English people of Irish descent
English women photographers
Fashion photographers
Vogue (magazine) people
The Sunday Times people
Suicides by jumping in France
Photographers from Paris
British expatriates in France
People from the City of Westminster
Birkin family
2013 suicides